Topaze was one of six s built for the French Navy in the first decade of the 20th century.

Design and description
The Émeraude class were built as part of the French Navy's 1903 building program to a Maugas single-hull design. The submarines displaced  surfaced and  submerged. Their crew numbered 2 officers and 23 enlisted men.

For surface running, the boats were powered by two Sautter-Harlé  diesel engines, each driving one propeller shaft. When submerged each propeller was driven by a 300-metric-horsepower electric motor.

The boats were armed with four internal  torpedo tubes, two in the bow and two in the stern, for which they carried six torpedoes. Topaze and her sister  were the first French submarines to be equipped with a deck gun when they were fitted with a single  gun in August 1915.

Construction and career
Topaz was laid down in October 1903 at the Arsenal de Toulon, launched on 2 July 1908 and commissioned on 10 December 1910.

Citations

Bibliography

Émeraude-class submarine (1906)
World War I submarines of France
1908 ships